Silent Storm is a 2003 tactical role-playing game for the PC.

Silent Storm may also refer to:

 Silent Storm (film), a 2003 documentary by Peter Butt
 Silent Storm Records, a UK record label
 "Silent Storm" (song), a 2014 song by Carl Espen and Norway's representative in the Eurovision Song Contest 2014

See also 
 Quiet storm (disambiguation)